Houts or van Houts is a surname. Notable people with the surname include:

Ashley Houts (born 1987), American basketball player
Marshall Houts (1919–1993), American academic, author, and attorney
Rudi van Houts (born 1984), Dutch road cyclist and mountain biker

See also
 Hout